State Route 794 (SR 794) is a state highway in Humboldt County, Nevada, United States. The highway primarily serves as a connector road east of Winnemucca and, for all but the very east end of the route, SR 794 is concurrent with Interstate 80 Business (I‑80 Bus.) as it runs along East Winnemucca Boulevard.

Route description

SR 794 begins at T-intersection with East Winnemucca Boulevard/East 2nd Street (SR 289) in northern Winnemucca. (From the intersection, SR 289 heads southwest [concurrent with I‑80 Bus.] along East Winnemucca Boulevard toward U.S. Route 95. SR 289 heads northeast along East 2nd Street toward I-80 [Exit 178] and then SR 795.) From its western terminus SR 794 heads southeast along East Winnemucca Boulevard (concurrent with I‑80 Bus.) to cross East 4th Street and pass under a moderately low railroad overpass (that carries a single set of Union Pacific Railroad tracks) before reaching an intersection with East Haskell Street/Fairgrounds Road. (East Haskell Road heads southwest to become State Route 294 [SR 294] at a junction with the eastern terminus of State Route 787. [Prior to 2017, SR 294 extended east to East Winnemucca Boulevard.] Fairgrounds Road heads northeast to loop past multiple Humboldt County facilities [fairgrounds, sheriff's office, county jail, etc.] before reconnecting with SR 794.)

Just after the intersection with East Haskell Street/Fairgrounds Road, SR 794 gradually curves easterly until it heads northeast and reaches an intersection with the north end of North Highland Drive. (From this intersection a dirt road also heads north to connect with Fairgrounds Road.) Continuing northeast the route connects with the east end of Fairgrounds Road (which runs north from the route), the north end of Estate Road, the south end of Guthrie Drive, the south end of Maslona Drive, the north end of Great Basin Drive, and the north end of Wild West Way. After connecting with the north end of Rim Rock Drive, SR 794 curves to very briefly head east before curving north and connecting with I‑80 at a diamond interchange (Exit 180). On the north edge of the interchange East Winnemucca Boulevard becomes Pedroli Avenue, which promptly curves the west and quickly arrives at the eastern terminus of SR 794 at a cattle guard. (On the immediate west side of the cattle guard, Pedroli Avenue turns north, becomes a dirt road, and heads north to Weso. The road continues westerly as Pedroli Lane, being still paved for a short distance farther as it heads toward a nearby farm.)

Major intersections

See also

 List of state routes in Nevada
 List of highways numbered 794

Notes

References

External links

794
Transportation in Humboldt County, Nevada
Winnemucca, Nevada
Interstate 80